Kothapalle is a village in Kothapalle mandal, situated in Nellore district of the Indian state of Andhra Pradesh.

References

Villages in Nellore district